Heavy Metal Maniac is the debut studio album by the Canadian speed metal band Exciter, released through Shrapnel Records in 1983. The album was reissued by Megaforce Records in 2005.

Heavy Metal Maniac was inducted into the Decibel Magazine Hall of Fame in a special issue regarding the Top 100 Old-School Metal Albums of All Time.

Track listing 

Tracks 12 & 13 interviews were recorded on November 7, 1982, on CKCU in Ottawa, Canada.
Track 14 backstage interview recorded in August 1982 for CHEZ 106 before opening for Black Sabbath at Ottawa Exhibition.

Credits 
 Dan Beehler − vocals, drums
 John Ricci − guitar, backing vocals
 Allan Johnson − bass, backing vocals

Production 
Andy Brown – artwork, concept

References 

1983 debut albums
Exciter (band) albums
Shrapnel Records albums